Eurythecta curva is a species of moth of the family Tortricidae. It is found in New Zealand.

The wingspan is 14–15 mm. The forewings are ochreous whitish with scattered fuscous scales. There is a bright ochreous mark in the disc above the middle. The hindwings are greyish fuscous.

References

Moths described in 1918
Archipini
Moths of New Zealand